Bryan Wells  (born February 24, 1966) is a Canadian former professional ice hockey player and ice hockey coach. He coached the Wichita Thunder from 1996–2001.

Career statistics

References

External links
 

1966 births
Living people
Brandon Wheat Kings players
Canadian expatriate ice hockey players in the United States
Canadian ice hockey coaches
Canadian ice hockey centres
Carolina Thunderbirds players
Regina Pats players
Wichita Thunder coaches
Wichita Thunder players